Kasuku is a commune of the city of Kindu in the Democratic Republic of the Congo.

Populated places in Maniema
Communes of the Democratic Republic of the Congo